Persoonia pentasticha is a species of flowering plant in the family Proteaceae and is endemic to the south-west of Western Australia.

Description
Flowering occurs from August to November.

Taxonomy
Persoonia pentasticha was first formally described in 1994 by Peter Weston in the journal Telopea from specimens collected by John Stanley Beard north of Wubin in 1963.

Distribution and habitat
This geebung grows in sandy soil in heath the area between Mullewa, Mingenew, Wubin and Paynes Find in the south-west of Western Australia.

Conservation status
Persoonia pentasticha is classified as "Priority Three" by the Government of Western Australia Department of Parks and Wildlife meaning that it is poorly known and known from only a few locations but is not under imminent threat.

References

pentasticha
Flora of Western Australia
Plants described in 1994
Taxa named by Peter H. Weston